Kingswood is an outer-suburb of Tamworth, New South Wales, located south of the city. It is located off the New England Highway and is located south of the suburb Hillvue and is a largely rural residential suburb. North East/East of Kingswood is the suburb Calala.

Suburbs of Tamworth, New South Wales